Anthony Avom Mbume (born 13 December 1968) is a Cameroonian wrestler. He competed in the men's freestyle 74 kg at the 1996 Summer Olympics.

References

External links
 

1968 births
Living people
Cameroonian male sport wrestlers
Olympic wrestlers of Cameroon
Wrestlers at the 1996 Summer Olympics
Place of birth missing (living people)